CKIK-FM (101.3 MHz, Kraze 101.3) is a radio station in Red Deer, Alberta. Owned by Harvard Media, it broadcasts a CHR/Top 40 format.

History 
The station received CRTC approval on June 1, 2009, and launched on July 24, 2009.

Originally owned by L.A. Radio Group, the station was acquired by Harvard Broadcasting in December 2015.

CKIK-FM is a former callsign of a radio station in Calgary, which is known today as CFGQ-FM.

References

External links
 
 

Kik
Kik
Radio stations established in 2009
2009 establishments in Alberta
Kik